The Boysen Dam is a rockfill dam on the Wind River in the U.S. state of Wyoming. The dam lies at the head of Wind River Canyon through the Owl Creek Mountains in western Wyoming and creates Boysen Reservoir. It is owned by the U.S. Bureau of Reclamation and furnishes irrigation water supply to the Bighorn Basin as well as providing flood control and hydroelectric power.

History

The first dam to be built at the Wind River Canyon site was actually in 1908, when Asmus Boysen supervised the construction of a small concrete run-of-the-river structure that generated 710 kilowatts of electricity. This early dam, located just downriver of the present Boysen Dam, silted up by 1925 and was removed in 1948. As early as 1904, the Bureau of Reclamation also made investigative forays into the area for the construction of a dam, although a final report was not completed until 1942.

Construction

Preliminary work for construction of Boysen Dam was begun on September 9, 1946 and included the installation of government buildings, an employee camp, warehouses, electrical transmission lines and the relocation of U.S. Highway 20 and the Chicago, Burlington and Quincy Railway to bypass the construction site. The contract for the dam itself and the rerouting of the rail line was awarded to the Morrison-Knudsen Company for $13.9 million. Most of the preparatory work including foundation excavations and the various camp facilities were completed by the end of autumn 1947, and official groundbreaking was on September 19 of that year.

By March 1949, the diversion tunnel was successfully complete and the rail realignment mostly finished despite several minor setbacks including a rockslide and a fire that destroyed the concrete mixing plant. On December 23, 1949 a cofferdam across the Wind was finished and the river began flowing through the diversion tunnel, allowing work to proceed on the main section of the dam. As the embankment rose, the train tunnel was completed and opened on September 5, 1950 and work begun on the dam's power plant. Contracts for clearing the reservoir area were awarded beginning in September and came out to about $637,000.

Construction on the powerhouse continued through 1951 and equipment began coming into the dam site beginning in July of that year. The total cost of the generators and other apparatus came to $604,501. The embankment of the dam was completed a month later, and on October 11, 1951, the diversion tunnel was sealed and Boysen Reservoir began to rise. The powerhouse was finished in December 1951 and the entire dam was completed on February 16, 1952 at a cost of $18,576,405. The dam was declared operational on December 11, 1952.

Structure and operations

The hydraulic head is only about  because of the great depth to bedrock from the riverbed, thus necessitating a large amount of excavation for the dam foundations. The dam provides electricity for regions of Wyoming ranging from Alcova to Thermopolis.

The dam also serves an important purpose of flood control, and has prevented about $75 million of damages from its completion to 1998.

Energy Generation Data

See also
Bighorn River
List of reservoirs and dams in the United States

References

External links
Boysen State Park
Boysen Reservoir

Dams in Wyoming
United States Bureau of Reclamation dams
Dams completed in 1952
1952 establishments in Wyoming
Hydroelectric power plants in Wyoming